Nematabad-e Rigan (also Romanized as Ne‘matābād-e Rīgān; also known as Ne‘matābād) is a village in Rigan Rural District, in the Central District of Rigan County, Kerman Province, Iran. At the 2006 census, its population was 685, in 173 families.

References 

Populated places in Rigan County